The 2022 Kuchyně Gorenje Prague Open was a professional tennis tournament played on outdoor clay courts. It was the ninth edition of the tournament which was part of the 2022 ITF Women's World Tennis Tour. It took place in Prague, Czech Republic between 28 August and 4 September 2022.

Champions

Singles

  Réka Luca Jani def.  Noma Noha Akugue, 6–3, 7–6(7–4)

Doubles

  Elixane Lechemia /  Julia Lohoff def.  Linda Klimovičová /  Dominika Šalková, 7–5, 7–5

Singles main draw entrants

Seeds

 1 Rankings are as of 22 August 2022.

Other entrants
The following players received wildcards into the singles main draw:
  Linda Klimovičová
  Aneta Laboutková
  Julie Štruplová
  Tereza Valentová
  Karolína Vlčková

The following players received entry from the qualifying draw:
  Veronika Erjavec
  Funa Kozaki
  Misaki Matsuda
  Luisa Meyer auf der Heide
  Barbora Michálková
  Chiara Scholl
  Ivana Šebestová
  Aurora Zantedeschi

The following player received entry as a lucky loser:
  Amanda Carreras

References

External links
 2022 Kuchyně Gorenje Prague Open at ITFtennis.com
 Official website

2022 ITF Women's World Tennis Tour
2022 in Swiss tennis
August 2022 sports events in the Czech Republic
September 2022 sports events in the Czech Republic